The Dakota Dunes Open was a golf tournament on the Buy.com Tour. It was inaugurated in 1990 as one of the founding tournaments on the tour, then known as the Ben Hogan Tour, and ran until 2001. It was played in Sioux City, Iowa for the first three years before moving to the Dakota Dunes Country Club in Dakota Dunes, South Dakota in 1993, where it stayed for the remainder of its existence.

In 2001 the winner received $76,500.

Winners

Notes

Multiple winners
2 wins: Pat Bates, Chris Smith

References

Former Korn Ferry Tour events
Golf in Iowa
Golf in South Dakota
Recurring sporting events established in 1990
Recurring sporting events disestablished in 2001
1990 establishments in Iowa
2001 disestablishments in South Dakota